Naseerabad is a neighbourhood in the Karachi Central district of Karachi, Pakistan. The term is often used to refer to Block 14 of Federal B Area, Karachi.

PLACES 
There are many famous places like haji mehfooz sheermal house , Asif rabri house , Ambala kabab house , Iqbal Pan shop , Salimabad Jamat khana , Kundan broast , Allama iqbal University And there are also many apartments like "Al-Siraj Square" , Fareed square , mehboob square , Ruqaiya square and many more.

See also 
 Gulberg
 Aisha Manzil
 Ancholi
 Azizabad
 Karimabad
 Shafiq Mill Colony
 Water Pump
 Yaseenabad
 Musa Colony
 Dastagir Colony
 Dastagir Colony

References

External links 
 Karachi Website

Neighbourhoods of Karachi
Gulberg Town, Karachi
Karachi Central District